The 2020 Icelandic Cup, also known as Mjólkurbikarinn for sponsorship reasons, was the 61st edition of the Icelandic national football cup.

The competition was abandoned on 30 October 2020 before the semi-finals due to the COVID-19 pandemic in Iceland.

First round
56 clubs competed in the first round. The matches were played from 5–8 June 2020.

Second round
A total of forty teams competed in the second round. Ties were played from 12–14 June.

Third round (round of 32)
A total of 32 teams competed in this round of the competition, with the clubs from the Úrvalsdeild entering at this stage. Ties were played from 23–25 June.

Fourth round (round of 16)
A total of sixteen teams competed in the fourth round, with matches played on 30 and 31 July.

Quarter-finals (round of 8)
A total of eight teams competed in the quarter-finals, with matches played on 25 August and 10 September.

Semi-finals (round of 4)
A total of four teams were originally scheduled to compete in the semi-finals, with matches played on 4 November.

Final
Two teams were originally scheduled to contest the final, with the match played on 8 November.

References

External links

Icelandic Men's Football Cup
Cup
Icelandic Cup
Icelandic Cup